The women's 1500 metres at the 2010 IAAF World Indoor Championships was held at the ASPIRE Dome on 12 and 14 March.

Medalists

Records

Qualification standards

Schedule

Results

Heats
Qualification: First 3 in each heat (Q) and the next 3 fastest (q) advance to the final.

Final

References
Heats Results
Final Result

1500 metres
1500 metres at the World Athletics Indoor Championships
2010 in women's athletics